Naomi Boretz (born 1935) is an American artist.

Education
Boretz received a Bachelor's degree from Brooklyn College in 1957. In 1971 she earned an MFA degree in studio art from the City University of New York, followed by Master's degree in art history from Rutgers University.

Collections
Her work is included in the permanent collections of the Smithsonian American Art Museum the Metropolitan Museum of Art and the Whitney Museum of American Art.

References

1935 births
20th-century American women artists
21st-century American women artists
Living people
Brooklyn College alumni
Artists in the Smithsonian American Art Museum collection